7P/Pons–Winnecke (also known as Comet Pons–Winnecke) is a periodic Jupiter-family comet with a six-year orbit. Early calculations for the 1921 apparition suggested that the orbit of the comet might collide with Earth in June, but observations on 10 April ruled out an impact. It made a very close approach to Earth in June 1927. The outward migration of perihelion created impressive meteor showers in 1916, 1921 and 1927.

The next perihelion passage is 25 August 2027 when the comet will have a solar elongation of 63 degrees. The last perihelion passage was 27 May 2021 when the comet had a solar elongation of 107 degrees at approximately apparent magnitude 11. It passed  from Earth on 12 June 2021. Before that it came to perihelion on 30 January 2015 with a solar elongation of 24 degrees.

Jean Louis Pons (Marseille) originally discovered the comet on 12 June 1819, it was later rediscovered by Friedrich August Theodor Winnecke (Bonn) on 9 March 1858. It is the parent body of the June Bootids of late June.

7P has an orbital period of 6.37 years. It has a perihelion of 1.3 AU and an aphelion of 5.6 AU (past the orbit of Jupiter). A close approach to Jupiter in July 2037 will drop perihelion back to 0.982 AU.

The comet nucleus is estimated at about 5.2 km in diameter.

Proposed exploration

The Jet Propulsion Laboratory proposed a flyby of the comet with a flight spare of Mariner 4 with the closest approach taking place in 1969. The probe was instead used for a Venus flyby as Mariner 5.

References

External links 
 Orbital simulation from JPL (Java) / Horizons Ephemeris
Elements and Ephemeris for 7P/Pons-Winnecke – Minor Planet Center
 7P/Pons-Winnecke – Seiichi Yoshida @ aerith.net
 7P – Gary W. Kronk's Cometography
 article on the nuclei of 7P, 14P, and 92P

Periodic comets
0007
007P
Meteor shower progenitors
Comets in 2015
20210527
18190612